Microbacterium halotolerans is a Gram-positive, halophilic aerobic, non-spore-forming and non-motile bacterium from the genus Microbacterium which has been isolated from hypersaline soil in China.

References

Further reading

External links
Type strain of Microbacterium halotolerans at BacDive -  the Bacterial Diversity Metadatabase

Bacteria described in 2005
Halophiles
halotolerans